Mogakolodi Ngele (born 6 October 1990 in Gaborone) is a Botswana footballer who currently plays for South African club Chippa United and the Botswana national football team as a midfielder. He joined Bidvest Wits from Mamelodi Sundowns. He was a participant at the 2012 Africa Cup of Nations. In 2014, he signed a 5-year contract with Mamelodi Sundowns F.C. however, he will stay with his current club until the end of the 2014–15 season. Bidvest Wits then signed him on loan again until the end of the 2016–17 season which Bidvest Wits and Ngele won the Absa Premiership title beating the likes of Cape Town, Mamelodi Sundowns and Kaizer Chiefs.

After returning from his loan spell at Bidvest Wit, in his 2017–18 season he struggled to get playing time, only playing on game in the whole season, with Mamelodi Sundowns coach Pitso Mosimane saying "He needs to prove himself to get into the starting eleven".

On 26 January 2018 he was signed on loan for 6 months by Absa Premiership team Supersport United.

International

International goals
Scores and results list Botswana's goal tally first.

Honours

Individual
Mascom Top 8 Cup Top Goalscorer: 2012
Telkom knockout winner with Platinum Stars: 2013
MTN 8 winner with Platinum stars: 2013

Team
 Absa Premiership Title 2016/17

References

External links
 
 African Cup of Nations – Selolwane to skipper Botswana

1990 births
Living people
People from Gaborone
Botswana footballers
Botswana international footballers
Botswana expatriate footballers
Uniao Flamengo Santos F.C. players
Township Rollers F.C. players
Platinum Stars F.C. players
Mamelodi Sundowns F.C. players
Bidvest Wits F.C. players
SuperSport United F.C. players
Black Leopards F.C. players
South African Premier Division players
Expatriate soccer players in South Africa
Botswana expatriate sportspeople in South Africa
2012 Africa Cup of Nations players
Association football midfielders
Tshakhuma Tsha Madzivhandila F.C. players